is a Japanese singer from Saitama who has released music under Key Sounds Label since 2012. In 2013, she sang the ending theme song to the anime series Little Busters! Refrain.

Career
Ayaka Kitazawa had an interest in singing from a young age, and she played the double bass in junior high and high school. After graduating from high school, she pursued her love of singing and went on to attend a music-related vocational school. While still at the school, she participated in national singing competitions such as "Jaccom Music Festival" in December 2008 and "Seishun! Hamo Nep League" in March 2009. In September 2011, Kitazawa sang one song on Denshi Kensetsu's album Ongaku Shiki Complete Dam released by Victor Entertainment. After graduation, she was contracted under the Sun Music Brain talent agency from 2012 to 2013. In January 2012, she auditioned to be a singer on Shinji Orito's album Circle of Fifth released by Key Sounds Label later that year in October, and was chosen to sing six songs. Kitazawa's debut single  was released on November 6, 2013; "Kimi to no Nakushi Mono" was used as the ending theme to the 2013 anime series Little Busters! Refrain. In April 2014, Key Sounds Label used the crowdfunding website MotionGallery to raise funds to produce Kitazawa's debut album. After two days, the project reached its goal of 1 million yen, and after 30 days had earned 2,707,000 yen. Kitazawa's debut album Nature Couleur was released on June 25, 2014.

Discography

Albums

Singles

Other album appearances

Other video album appearances

References

External links
 
Ayaka Kitazawa's personal blog 
 

1989 births
Anime musicians
Japanese women pop singers
Living people
Musicians from Saitama Prefecture
21st-century Japanese singers
21st-century Japanese women singers